Timaru is a port city in the southern Canterbury Region of New Zealand, located  southwest of Christchurch and about  northeast of Dunedin on the eastern Pacific coast of the South Island. The Timaru urban area is home to  people, and is the largest urban area in South Canterbury, and the second largest in the Canterbury Region overall, after Christchurch.

Caroline Bay beach is a popular recreational area located close to Timaru's main centre, just to the north of the substantial port facilities. Beyond Caroline Bay, the industrial suburb of Washdyke is at a major junction with State Highway 8, the main route into the Mackenzie Country. This provides a road link to Pleasant Point, Fairlie, Twizel, Lake Tekapo, Aoraki / Mount Cook and Queenstown.

Timaru has been built on rolling hills created from the lava flows of the extinct Mt Horrible volcano, which last erupted thousands of years ago. The result is that most of the main streets are undulating, a clear contrast with the flat landscape of the Canterbury Plains to the north. This volcanic rock is used for the construction of local "bluestone" buildings.

History

Māori settlement 
The origin of the name 'Timaru' is disputed. Some believe that it derives from Māori Te Maru, which can mean a 'place of shelter'. However, other authorities allege that Timaru originates from a literal translation of the combination of ti, a cabbage tree and maru, meaning 'shady'.

Māori waka seem to have employed the site of Timaru as a place to rest on journeys up and down the eastern coastline for many years before the arrival of the first Europeans in the 19th century. The area includes over 500 sites with traces of Māori rock art, particularly in the rock overhangs and caves of the Opuha and Opihi river valleys, to the west of modern-day Timaru. Archaeologists have suggested that Māori iwi (tribes) were permanently settled in the district before 1400 AD. During the 17th or 18th century the resident Ngāti Mamoe were driven southwards into Fiordland by an invasion of the Ngāi Tahu, who came from the North Island.

Te Runanga o Arowhenua is the hapu for Aoraki/Timaru District. Their marae is located just outside Temuka.

19th century onwards 

European settlement began with the construction of a whaling station in 1839 by the Weller brothers of Otago at Patiti Point, close to the present town centre. A supply ship, The Caroline, provided the name for a local bay. Later a sheep station, known as The Levels, was set up on land obtained by the Rhodes brothers, and run by George Rhodes. One of the earliest settlers was Captain Henry Cain, who set up a store in 1857 on behalf of Henry Le Cren of Lyttelton, and Le Cren himself moved to Timaru in the following year.

Few lived in Timaru until 1859 when the ship SS Strathallan arrived from England, carrying a party of 120 immigrants. Persistent land disputes arose between the Rhodes brothers and local government officials with the result that two townships were established in the port area, Government Town and Rhodestown. These eventually merged into a single community in 1868. Given this division, until recently none of the main north-south streets lined up. Stafford Street, which became the main thoroughfare, was formed along the early bullock wagon trail.

Following the loss of a number of vessels off the coast, the breakwater design by Engineer John Goodall was adopted and work started on the redevelopment of the artificial port in 1877, which eventually caused sand washed south down the Pacific shoreline to build up against the northern mole. This was the beginning of the extensive land reclamation around the Caroline Bay district, an area which is still growing today.

Timaru continued to expand during the 20th century, with much of the development taking the form of wooden colonial style bungalows set in individual sections of land. Sacred Heart Basilica was opened in 1911.

Geography
Timaru is situated along the Pacific Ocean coast. Much of the hinterland is farmland. To the north and northeast are the Canterbury Plains.

Suburbs 

 Washdyke
 Smithfield
 Grantlea
 Waimataitai
 Marchwiel
 Timaru Central
 Maori Hill
 Highfield
 Glenwood
 Gleniti
 Seaview
 West End
 Watlington
 Parkside
 Kensington
 Redruth
 Oceanview
 Port Timaru

Climate
Timaru has a relatively dry temperate climate similar to that of neighbouring Ashburton and Christchurch, classified as oceanic climate (Cfb) by Köppen-Geiger climate classification system. Temperatures are warm in summer and cold in winter, with Timaru's extreme maximum temperature being 41.3 °C on 6 February 2011 and extreme minimum temperature of −9.1 °C on 3 August 1998. Rain is evenly distributed throughout the year, with a very small proportion of it falling as snow.

Demographics 
The Timaru urban area is defined by Statistics New Zealand as a medium urban area.

Timaru had a population of 27,498 at the 2018 New Zealand census, an increase of 1,236 people (4.7%) since the 2013 census, and an increase of 1,380 people (5.3%) since the 2006 census. There were 11,502 households. There were 13,368 males and 14,133 females, giving a sex ratio of 0.95 males per female, with 4,758 people (17.3%) aged under 15 years, 4,893 (17.8%) aged 15 to 29, 11,709 (42.6%) aged 30 to 64, and 6,147 (22.4%) aged 65 or older.

Ethnicities were 89.2% European/Pākehā, 9.3% Māori, 2.4% Pacific peoples, 5.2% Asian, and 1.8% other ethnicities (totals add to more than 100% since people could identify with multiple ethnicities).

The proportion of people born overseas was 13.8%, compared with 27.1% nationally.

Although some people objected to giving their religion, 47.8% had no religion, 40.9% were Christian, 0.9% were Hindu, 0.3% were Muslim, 0.3% were Buddhist and 2.1% had other religions.

Of those at least 15 years old, 2,892 (12.7%) people had a bachelor or higher degree, and 5,742 (25.3%) people had no formal qualifications. 2,979 people (13.1%) earned over $70,000 compared to 17.2% nationally. The employment status of those at least 15 was that 10,791 (47.5%) people were employed full-time, 3,264 (14.4%) were part-time, and 648 (2.8%) were unemployed.

Government 

The mayor of Timaru District is Nigel Bowen.

Timaru is part of the parliamentary electorate of Rangitata, represented by Jo Luxton of the New Zealand Labour Party.

Sister cities
Timaru District has established four sister city relationships.

 Orange, New South Wales, Australia
 Weihai, Shandong, China
 Eniwa, Hokkaidō, Japan
 Orange, California, United States of America

Economy 
Timaru is an agricultural service town and port for the South Canterbury regional economy. Timaru is one of the major cargo ports of the South Island, with a number of light manufacturing plants associated with the export and import trade. Many of these producers are concerned with processing, packing, and distributing meat, dairy and other agricultural produce.

Timaru is the second largest fishing port in New Zealand.

Allan Hubbard the chartered accountant and philanthropist established the failed finance company South Canterbury Finance and accounting firm Hubbard Churcher in Timaru and lived locally until his death in a car accident on 2 September 2011.

Shopping 
Retailing is concentrated around the Stafford Street area. In addition there are a number of local shopping malls distributed around the city, with extensive car parking facilities.

Tourist attractions 

The South Canterbury Museum is the main museum for the region, containing exhibits relating to physical geography and the environment, fossil remains, Māori rock art, the early settlement of the district, local maritime history, scrimshaw, the E P Seally natural history collection, and information about Richard Pearse, a local inventor and his attempts at manned flight in the first years of the 20th century.

The Aigantighe (a Scots Gaelic word pronounced "egg and tie") Art Gallery in Wai-iti Road is the South Island's third largest art museum. It holds a collection of New Zealand, Pacific, Asian and European art works from the sixteenth century to the present day and includes a sculpture garden. The gallery was founded in 1956 and is housed in a homestead built in 1908.

Timaru has with a number of open spaces, public gardens and parks. The Trevor Griffiths Rose Garden at Caroline Bay Park  is a major feature of the Timaru Piazza development. The parkland of the Bay Area contains a mini golf course, a roller skating rink, a maze and staging for musical events. It is home to the annual Summer Carnival that takes place over the Christmas and New Year holiday period. To the south of the city centre are the Timaru Botanic Gardens, first laid out in 1864, with a notable collection of roses and native tree ferns. To the west is the Centennial Park Reserve, opened in 1940, that includes a tranquil 3.5 km walkway following the wooded valley of the Otipua Creek.

The DB Mainland Brewery in Sheffield Street offers tours and tasting sessions.

The Caroline Bay Carnival, featuring live performances, games, and side shows, takes place from Boxing Day through to mid-January at Caroline Bay Park.

Aoraki Tourism is the official tourism body for the whole Timaru District.

Recreation and leisure

Performing arts 
The Theatre Royal at 118 Stafford Street was home of much of Timaru's live entertainment up to 2019, however it is currently closed for renovations. The South Canterbury Drama League hosts shows at the Playhouse.

Public libraries 
The Timaru District Library has branches situated in Timaru, Temuka and Geraldine.

The first Reading Room was opened in the School House, Barnard Street in 1862. It was open daily from 5.00pm – 10.00pm and on Saturdays 10.00am – 8.00pm. English and Colonial Newspapers were provided and a selection of Library Books for the use by members. In 1870 the Mechanics Institute was created by an addition on an existing building and aimed to provide a Library, Reading Room and News Room.

Timaru Public Library was officially opened in 1909 on the present Timaru District Council site. It was a Carnegie library, built with a 3,000 pound grant from Andrew Carnegie of New York – the condition under which the money was given was that the reading rooms should be open to everyone and that the lending Library should be free to ratepayers of the borough. The current library was opened on Sophia Street by the roundabout in 1979. It was designed by Miles, Warren and Mahoney.

Sports

Sporting venues 
Timaru has a comprehensive range of community sporting facilities designed to international standards for rugby, tennis, yachting, Hardcourt Bike Polo, swimming, netball, motor racing, cricket, golf, hockey, croquet, pistol shooting, trap shooting and bowls. Aorangi Park is Timaru's major sporting venue. The Council also operates the CBAY Complex which includes upgrades to the old swimming pool, a restaurant and gym. Timaru is also home to the Timaru International Motor Raceway, which is one of only 4 permanent sealed motor racing circuits in the South island.

Football 
Timaru's main football ground is Sir Basil Arthur Park. It has four senior pitches and six junior pitches. Football is also played at The Caledonian Grounds, Anzac Square, West End Park, Aorangi Park and Marchwiel Park. Clubs include West End AFC, Northern Hearts, Timaru City, Timaru Thistle and Pleasant Point.

Golf 
Timaru has many golf clubs and well-maintained golf courses, including:
 Highfield Golf Club
 Gleniti Golf Club
 Timaru Golf Club

and in close proximity to these:
 Pleasant Point Golf Club
 St. Andrews Golf Club
 Maungati Golf Club (9 holes)
 Temuka Golf Club

Rugby 
 South Canterbury Rugby Football Union is based in Timaru. Fraser Park is the home of local rugby.
 In the wake of the February 2011 Christchurch earthquake, the Super Rugby team, the Crusaders, moved two seasonal games to Timaru.

Surfing 
 Patiti Point, near Timaru city, has a left-hand reef break, which operates very consistently in any swell from the east or south.
 Jack's Point (3 km south of Timaru) has both left and right-hand reef breaks at high tide, as does Lighthouse Reef, a short walk to the south. Southerly swells produce super-heavyweight monster breakers along the Timaru coast, which are only suitable for top-gun surfers.

Inline speed skating
Timaru has New Zealand's largest Inline speed skating teams, South Canterbury, which has national records in several disciplines. The club has held many national tournaments over the years and holds the annual tour of Timaru.

Transport 
Timaru is on State Highway 1 (SH1), the main road route down the eastern coast of the South Island.

There are regular coach and minibus services to Christchurch, Dunedin, Invercargill, Queenstown and the Mackenzie Country, leaving from outside the Visitor Information Centre, which provides booking facilities and other travel services.

The Main South Line section of the South Island Main Trunk Railway runs through Timaru and is a significant freight corridor.  Passenger rail services were discontinued after the cancellation of the Southerner in February 2002.  Between 1949 and 1970, Timaru was serviced by the South Island Limited, one of the former New Zealand Railways Department's most prestigious trains.

Richard Pearse Airport is to the north of the town. It is equipped to handle light aircraft and short haul domestic flights, with regular services to Wellington

The “Timaru Link” bus service runs weekdays and the on demand bus service known as “MyWay” run daily.

Utilities
Timaru's water comes from the Pareora River and Opihi River, and is stored in the Claremont Reservoir. Timaru's water is treated with ozone and is chlorinated.

Education 

Further information: List of schools in Canterbury, New Zealand

Primary
Barton Rural Primary School (previously Fairview)
Beaconsfield Primary School (previously Pareora West)
Bluestone Primary School (previously West School)
Gleniti Primary School
Grantlea Downs (previously Grantlea)
Highfield Primary School
Oceanview Heights Primary School (previously Marchwiel School)
Sacred Heart Primary
St. Josephs School
Timaru Christian School
Timaru South School
Waimataitai Primary School

Secondary
Aoraki Alternative Education Center
Craighead Diocesan School
Mountainview High School
Roncalli College
Timaru Boys' High School
Timaru Girls' High School

Tertiary
Ara Institute of Canterbury

Media

Print 
The Timaru Herald is the local daily newspaper for the district and has been published since the mid nineteenth century. Papers are printed in Ashburton and then distributed throughout the Otago and South Canterbury region. The Herald is owned by Stuff (formerly Fairfax New Zealand). The High Country Herald, also published by Stuff , has a circulation of 43,000 copies.

The region also supports a weekly community newspaper, The Timaru Courier, which has a circulation of over 24,000 copies and is delivered free every Thursday to local households. The Courier is owned by Allied Press of Dunedin.

Radio 
Timaru has one local FM radio station 100.3FM South Canterbury. There are also many networked FM radio stations, and a volunteer-run Hospital Radio 88.0/107.5 which celebrated its 30th anniversary in 2019.

Notable residents

Academics 
Hugh D. Wilson, botanist

Business
Henry Le Cren, Timaru pioneer and first European trader
Fulbert Archer, of the merchant house Miles Archer and Co 1867–1893; first Chairman of the Timaru Harbour Board

Politics 
James Craigie, politician
Basil Arthur, politician
Jo Goodhew, politician
Jim Sutton, politician

Film and television 
Phillip Leishman, broadcaster
Kevin Smith, actor.
Josh Thomson

Journalism 
Allen Curnow, poet and journalist
John Hardcastle, journalist and amateur scientist

Medicine 
 Edith Tennent, nurse and Matron of Dunedin Hospital, born in Timaru

Music 
Peter Dawkins, Record producer and musician
Michael Houstoun, concert pianist

Art 
Rosemary Campbell, painter
Betty Curnow, painter and printmarker

Drama 
Violet Targuse, playwright

Religious leaders 
Reginald Delargey, Roman Catholic cardinal

Aviation 
Richard Pearse, farmer, inventor and pioneering aviator

Sports 
Uini Atonio, professional rugby player, French international
Hamish Bennett, cricketer, former Black Cap
Craig Cumming, former Black Cap cricketer, sports broadcaster
Bob Fitzsimmons, World Heavyweight Champion from 17 March 1897 until 9 June 1899
Ross Gillespie New Zealand Olympic field hockey representative
Tony Lamborn, Professional rugby player, USA international
Brendan Laney,  former professional rugby player, sports broadcaster
Danyon Loader, men's swimming Olympic champion, born in Timaru
Jack Lovelock, New Zealand runner, 1936 Olympic 1500m champion, world mile record holder
Hayden Paddon, rally driver, 2011 Production World Rally Championship champion
Mark Moreton Parker, NZ cricketer
Murray Parker, NZ cricketer
Aki Seiuli, NZ Rugby Player, Otago, Glasgow Warriors
Haidee Tiffen, NZ women's cricketer
John Ward, NZ cricketer
Tomas Walsh, NZ shotputter

See also
 Phar Lap

References

Further reading 
 James Belich, Russell Brown, and Martin Robinson (2004) New Zealand, Lonely Planet Series
 Darroch Donald (2003) New Zealand, 2nd Edition, Footprint Guide Series.
 Laura Harper, Tony Mudd and Paul Whitfield (2000) The Rough Guide to New Zealand, Rough Guide Series
 Mark Lawson (1993) The Battle for Room Service: Journeys to all the safe places

External links 

 Timaru District Council
 Tourist information
 Timaru District Library
 South Canterbury Museum
 Historic images of Timaru from the collection of the Museum of New Zealand Te Papa Tongarewa

 
Populated places in Canterbury, New Zealand
Port cities in New Zealand